Joker is a 2012 Indian Hindi-language science fiction comedy film directed by Shirish Kunder and also his second directorial venture after Jaan-E-Mann. The film stars Akshay Kumar and Sonakshi Sinha in lead roles. This was the second film in which Sinha paired opposite Kumar after Rowdy Rathore (2012). The film released worldwide on 31 August 2012, and received mixed to negative response upon release. The film was declared a "Disaster" at box office. The trailer of the film revealed on 11 July 2012, and also in cinemas along with Cocktail.

Plot
Agastya "Sattu" is a scientist, working on the development of a communication system, to communicate with aliens. But Agastya loses the faith of his seniors and is allotted a deadline of one month to conclude his project with some substantial results.

In the meantime, Agastya is informed by his girlfriend Diva about his father's illness. On hearing this they both reach his native village Paglapur, whose colourful inhabitants include his brother who speaks in gibberish, a kid who thinks he is a lamp post and everyone else who think that World War II is still going on and fear the Germans.

Soon after reaching there, Agastya finds that he was called on a false pretext of illness by his father. They called Agastya, so he could make the village a better place and connect it with the outer world.

On getting apprised about truth, Agastya decides to move back to the US, but after hearing the plight of the inhabitants of Paglapur, due to the brushing aside of the village by the government because of its being absent from the demarcated map of India, he makes his mind to come out with some solution for the problem.

As the story proceeds, Agastya comes up with a quaint idea pertaining to the crop circle and the arrival of aliens in his village, to garner recognition for his otherwise isolated village undergoing a plight of neglect ever since the independence.

With frames moving ahead, Agastya along with other villagers creates a crop circle in Paglapur and spreads rumors about the arrival of aliens in the village. And from there, amid tremendous media hype, takes over some hilarious sequences knitted around UFO and fictitious man-made aliens.

In the end, the whole joke about the fake aliens is found out and at the end of the movie real aliens come and give the village the gift of oil.

Cast

 Akshay Kumar as Agastya "Sattu" / Rajkumar (Joker)
 Sonakshi Sinha as Diva
 Shreyas Talpade as Babban
 Minissha Lamba as Aanya
 Gurpreet Ghuggi as Bobby
 Darshan Jariwala as Baba (Agastya's father)
 Asrani as Guruji
 Sanjay Mishra as Rajaji
 Vindu Dara Singh as Sundi
 Pitobash as Kachua
 Alexx ONell as Simon
 Chitrangda Singh as a village dancer in the item song "Kafirana"
 Farah Khan in a Guest Appearance
 Vrajesh Hirjee as villager
 Aarya Babbar as Majnu Tangewala (cameo)

Production

Development
Shirish Kunder had the project in development for several years before finding financial backing and hit films, and had to negotiate for use of the specific title which Kunder stated is important to the script itself. The film is being produced by Farah Khan, Shirish Kunder, and Akshay Kumar under the banner of Three's Company and Hari Om Entertainment. The film was shot in 3D using 3D cameras, however in June 2012, it was announced that the film was no longer in 3D any more, since Ra.One and Don 2 have taken the goals, if Joker flopped it would be a loss on the whole crew, therefore the film will only be released in 2D format. According to director, Shirish Kunder, "It is an underdog story about how individuals make it big in life and in the process, get help from aliens from a fictional planet". Shreyas Talpade will play Akshay's brother in the film. Female lead opposite to Shreyas will be played by Minisha Lamba, who will enact the role of an innocent TV reporter. Sonakshi will also perform an item number in the film. American actor Alexx ONell was also signed to play a role in the film.

Filming
The first schedule of shooting was initially slated to take place in Ludhiana, however the location was changed to Chandigarh. The shooting began on 14 February 2011 in Chandigarh. The crew finished the 19-day schedule on 12 March 2011, finishing 40% of the production work. The second schedule started on 17 May 2011 in Mumbai and concluded in June 2011. The film is now slated to release on 31 August 2012. The theatrical trailer was released on UTV Motion Pictures' YouTube channel on 11 July 2012 only online. Whilst it released worldwide on television on 13 July 2012, and also in cinemas along with Cocktail.

Casting
Shrish Kunder wanted to cast Asin Thottumkal as the female lead but, she was not able to adjust the dates for the film so, producers cast Sonakshi Sinha opposite Akshay Kumar. Shreyas Talpade and Minissha Lamba were later cast in pivotal roles.

Reception
Joker received negative reviews from critics. . Independent Bollywood gave 2.5 out of 5 stars and said "A Funny and weird entertainer with message". Soumyadipta Banerjee of In.com gave 0.5 out of 5 stars and said "Not only that the aliens are weird, the whole movie seems be in some weird planet after a point of time". Saibal Chatterjee of NDTVMovies.com gave the film 1 out of 5 stars and wrote, "Joker is a crude joke of a film that will leave you in tears unless you have a stomach strong enough to digest such unmitigated junk." Film critic Taran Adarsh also gave it 1 out of 5 stars and labelled it as a complete "disaster" and a "joke of a film".

Music

All songs featured in the film except one, are composed by G. V. Prakash Kumar, nephew of noted composer, A. R. Rahman. The song Jugnu Banke Tu sung by Udit Narayan was highly appreciated among all songs. Udit also received Kalakar Award for best male playback singer for this song The song titled I Want Fakth You from Joker was leaked online on 1 July 2012, which has been composed by Gaurav Dagaonkar. The song has been acclaimed by the audience, however the song is actually named Kaafirana and will be released under that title worldwide and also on the soundtrack.

Audio review
Music Aloud said: "He may or may not have composed the tunes for the controversy-ridden soundtrack of Jaanemann, but when GV Prakash Kumar actually got to do a credited debut in Bollywood, it turned out to be a rather uninventive one" and rated it 5/10. Score Magazine, gave it 2 out of 5 stars stating, "You know something is wrong with an album when the instrumental tracks immensely outshine the vocal tracks. I must mention that each of the songs has a strong underlying melody but gross injustice is done to them by Shirish Kunder's lyrics."

Accolades

References

External links
 
 
 

2012 films
Films set in India
Films about hoaxes
Hari Om Entertainment films
Films scored by G. V. Prakash Kumar
Indian science fiction comedy films
2010s science fiction comedy films
UTV Motion Pictures films
Indian films with live action and animation
2012 comedy films
Films about extraterrestrial life